Shizuko Tōdō  is a Japanese novelist and essayist. She is best known for writing the novel , which won the 1988 Naoki Prize.

Biography 
Tōdō was born Masae Kumagai on September 14, 1949 in Hokkaido, Japan. She grew up in ill health, so she spent a lot of time reading and writing as a child. She especially enjoyed writing poetry. Her first collection of poems was published while she was attending Fuji Women's Junior College. After graduation she went on to work at a life insurance company, then an advertising agency.

Tōdo published several works under her birth name from 1978 onwards. Her first novel she released under her penname was called . It was published in 1987. It won the Hokkaido Shinbun Prize and was shortlisted for the Naoki Prize. It was later adapted into a film in 1990. Tōdo left the advertising agency soon after the publication of Madonna no Gotoku.

During the same year, she won the Naoki Prize for her work . Her publisher initially printed 8,000 copies of the book, but after the announcement of the award they decided to print 50,000 more. Tōdō went on to win many other awards as well.

Tōdō's works are largely romances featuring women who don't believe that the men that they are with will be faithful. Writer Sachiko Schierbeck also points out that there is a hint of lesbianism in Tōdō's stories, which is unusual for Japanese fiction.

Selected works 

 , 1988
 , 1988
 , 2001
 , 2003

References 

1949 births
Living people
People from Hokkaido
Naoki Prize winners

20th-century Japanese novelists